Shai  was the deification of the concept of fate in Egyptian mythology.

Shai may also refer to:

Shai (band), American 1990s vocal R&B/soul quartet
Shai (given name), includes list of people with the name
Shai (Haganah unit), former intelligence and counter-espionage arm of the Haganah